The ochre-breasted antpitta (Grallaricula flavirostris) is a species of bird placed in the family Grallariidae.
It is found in Bolivia, Colombia, Costa Rica, Ecuador, Panama, and Peru. Its natural habitat is subtropical or tropical moist montane forests.

Gallery

References

ochre-breasted antpitta
Birds of Costa Rica
Birds of Panama
Birds of the Northern Andes
ochre-breasted antpitta
ochre-breasted antpitta
Taxonomy articles created by Polbot